Peter Vardy (born 26 January 1976) is a former Australian rules footballer who played with the Adelaide Football Club and Melbourne Football Club in the Australian Football League (AFL).

A small forward, Vardy started his career at Adelaide where he was an AFL Rising Star nominee in 1997. A key member on the forward flank for the team, he broke his collarbone in the semi-final against , but managed to kick an extremely important goal in the process while riding a rough collision. This meant he was unable to participate in the last two finals of the Crows' first premiership. The following season he enjoyed another stellar year, accumulating 44 goals and being involved a premiership as the Crows won another premiership, kicking two goals from the wing in the grand final.

Vardy established himself as one of the league's most dangerous running forwards with regular consistent performances, however he fell out of favour with then-Adelaide coach Gary Ayres and at the end of 2001 was traded to Melbourne for draft pick number 56.

Playing statistics

|- style="background-color: #EAEAEA"
! scope="row" style="text-align:center" | 1996
|style="text-align:center;"|
| 30 || 7 || 5 || 4 || 53 || 18 || 71 || 18 || 8 || 0.7 || 0.6 || 7.6 || 2.6 || 10.1 || 2.6 || 1.1
|-
! scope="row" style="text-align:center" | 1997
|style="text-align:center;"|
| 30 || 24 || 28 || 21 || 216 || 90 || 306 || 74 || 39 || 1.2 || 0.9 || 9.0 || 3.8 || 12.8 || 3.1 || 1.6
|- style="background:#eaeaea;"
! scope="row" style="text-align:center" | 1998
|style="text-align:center;"|
| 30 || 18 || 44 || 23 || 163 || 67 || 230 || 58 || 32 || 2.4 || 1.3 || 9.1 || 3.7 || 12.8 || 3.2 || 1.8
|-
! scope="row" style="text-align:center" | 1999
|style="text-align:center;"|
| 30 || 11 || 16 || 13 || 88 || 35 || 123 || 41 || 6 || 1.5 || 1.2 || 8.0 || 3.2 || 11.2 || 3.7 || 0.5
|- style="background:#eaeaea;"
! scope="row" style="text-align:center" | 2000
|style="text-align:center;"|
| 30 || 20 || 39 || 17 || 140 || 58 || 198 || 52 || 19 || 2.0 || 0.9 || 7.0 || 2.9 || 9.9 || 2.6 || 1.0
|-
! scope="row" style="text-align:center" | 2001
|style="text-align:center;"|
| 30 || 16 || 18 || 21 || 121 || 46 || 167 || 52 || 28 || 1.1 || 1.3 || 7.6 || 2.9 || 10.4 || 3.3 || 1.8
|- style="background:#eaeaea;"
! scope="row" style="text-align:center" | 2002
|style="text-align:center;"|
| 19 || 21 || 39 || 31 || 151 || 72 || 223 || 77 || 32 || 1.9 || 1.5 || 7.2 || 3.4 || 10.6 || 3.7 || 1.5
|-
! scope="row" style="text-align:center" | 2003
|style="text-align:center;"|
| 19 || 9 || 5 || 9 || 43 || 40 || 83 || 22 || 18 || 0.6 || 1.0 || 4.8 || 4.4 || 9.2 || 2.4 || 2.0
|- style="background:#eaeaea;"
! scope="row" style="text-align:center" | 2004
|style="text-align:center;"|
| 19 || 11 || 12 || 16 || 70 || 36 || 106 || 35 || 14 || 1.1 || 1.5 || 6.4 || 3.3 || 9.6 || 3.2 || 1.3
|- class="sortbottom"
! colspan=3| Career
! 137
! 206
! 155
! 1045
! 462
! 1507
! 429
! 196
! 1.5
! 1.1
! 7.6
! 3.4
! 11.0
! 3.1
! 1.4
|}

References

External links

Demonwiki profile

1976 births
Living people
Australian rules footballers from South Australia
Adelaide Football Club players
Adelaide Football Club Premiership players
Melbourne Football Club players
Central District Football Club players
One-time VFL/AFL Premiership players